Ihaka Te Tai Hakuene (1836 – 6 April 1887) was a 19th-century New Zealand tribal leader, lay reader and a Māori member of the New Zealand parliament.

Of Māori descent, he identified with the Nga Puhi iwi. He was born in Rawhiti, Northland, New Zealand. He represented the Northern Maori electorate from 1884 to 1887, when he died.

A report suggests that he was accidentally poisoned by a dish containing tinned beef when dining in Auckland.

References

1836 births
1887 deaths
New Zealand MPs for Māori electorates
Members of the New Zealand House of Representatives
19th-century New Zealand politicians
Anglican lay readers
New Zealand Anglicans